The 2008–09 season was the first season that Chamois Niortais returned to the Championnat National following their relegation from Ligue 2 at the end of the previous campaign. Denis Troch was hired as the new head coach, replacing Samuel Michel. Niort won only 9 of their 38 league matches and their total of 41 points saw the team finish 17th in the Championnat National, which meant relegation to the Championnat de France amateur for the first time in the club's history in the 2008–09 season.

Appearances and goals
Striker Romain Jacuzzi made the most league appearances for Niort during the 2008–09 season, missing only two matches. He was also the club's top goalscorer with 11 in all competitions. Midfielders Ronan Biger and Matías Pérez García, defenders Yannick Fischer and Mamadou Camara and forward Arnaud Gonzalez were also among the players to make over 30 first-team appearances.

Championnat National

League table

Matches

Coupe de France
Niort joined the 2008–09 Coupe de France in the fifth round, along with the other clubs in the Championnat National. The team's first game in the cup was a 1–0 win against Division d'Honneur side US Chauvigny thanks to an injury time goal from midfielder Johan Gastien. In the sixth round, Niort were drawn away at Championnat de France amateur 2 club ESA Brive. They took a second-half lead through Romain Jacuzzi, but the home side equalised from a penalty kick from striker Oussama Belfoul. Jacuzzi was on target again in the seventh round, scoring Niort's first in a 2–1 win away at Les Herbiers VF before Argentine midfielder Matías Pérez García netted the winning goal three minutes from time.

Niort were handed a fourth consecutive away tie in the eighth round, being drawn to play away at Championnat de France amateur side Quimper on 13 December 2008. Following a goalless draw after extra time, during which defender Damien Da Silva was given a straight red card, Niort progressed 4–1 in a penalty shoot-out in which goalkeeper Kévin Aubeneau saved two spot kicks. In the round of 64, the team was drawn at home to Ligue 2 outfit US Boulogne. Niort scored first through Ronan Biger, but Congolese midfielder Christian Kinkela equalised for the visitors in the 86th minute to take the tie to extra time. Despite having defender Éric Cubilier sent off for a second bookable offence, Boulogne took the lead thanks to a Grégory Thil penalty following a foul by Mamadou Camara.

Coupe de la Ligue
As one of the teams relegated from Ligue 2 at the end of the 2007–08 season, Niort were eligible to contest the Coupe de la Ligue and entered the competition in the first round. The team was drawn to play Créteil away at the Stade Dominique Duvauchelle on 19 August 2008. Despite leading at half time through a goal from young midfielder Yvan Kibundu, Niort were defeated 1–2 thanks to late goals from the home side.

References

External links
Chamois Niortais official website 2008–09

Chamois Niortais F.C. seasons
Chamois Niortais